Hattorf am Harz is a municipality in the district of Göttingen, in Lower Saxony, Germany. It is situated in the southern Harz, approx. 10 km south of Osterode am Harz.

Hattorf is also the seat of the Samtgemeinde ("collective municipality") Hattorf am Harz.

Twinning 
Asten (Netherlands)

Coat of arms 
The coat of arms of Hattorf exists since 1952. 
The gear stands for the economic of the village, the ears of corn as symbols for the agriculture of Hattorf and the red kite for nature and environment.

References

Villages in the Harz